Thomas Cammell, of Shaftesbury, Dorset, was an English Member of Parliament.

He was a Member (MP) of the Parliament of England for Dorchester in 1372 and for Shaftesbury in 1381, May 1382, April 1384, November 1384, 1385, February 1388, January 1390, 1391, 1393, 1394, 1399 and 1402.
He was Mayor of Shaftesbury Michaelmas in 1390–1392 and 1400–01.

References

14th-century births
15th-century deaths
English MPs 1372
Mayors of Shaftesbury
People from Shaftesbury
English MPs 1381
English MPs May 1382
English MPs April 1384
English MPs November 1384
English MPs 1385
English MPs February 1388
English MPs January 1390
English MPs 1391
English MPs 1393
English MPs 1394
English MPs 1399
English MPs 1401